Odrava is a municipality and village in Cheb District in the Karlovy Vary Region of the Czech Republic. It has about 200 inhabitants.

Administrative parts
Villages of Dobroše, Mostov, Obilná and Potočiště are administrative parts of Odrava.

Geography
It lies in the Cheb Basin. It lies at the confluence of the rivers Odrava and Ohře,

History
The first written mention of Odrava is from 1370.

Transport
The D6 motorway runs through the municipality.

Gallery

References

External links

Villages in Cheb District